Reginald James Murray (25 April 1909 – 25 November 1962) was an Australian politician. Born in Wellington, New Zealand, he was educated at Hobart High School before becoming a clerk and airlines officer, and later an official with the Clerks' Union. He was Treasurer of the Tasmanian Labor Party before serving in the military from 1939 to 1947. In 1946, he was elected to the Australian Senate as a Labor Senator for Tasmania. He held the seat until his defeat in 1951, after which he became private secretary to Senator Nick McKenna. Murray died in 1962.

References

1909 births
1962 deaths
Australian Labor Party members of the Parliament of Australia
Members of the Australian Senate for Tasmania
Members of the Australian Senate
New Zealand people of Scottish descent
New Zealand people of Australian descent
Australian people of Scottish descent
New Zealand emigrants to Australia
20th-century Australian politicians